Philippe Aigrain (15 July 1949 – 11 July 2021) was a French computer scientist, activist  and researcher.

He was one of the directors of the Software Freedom Law Center in New York City and a cofounder of the French non-profit La Quadrature du Net. In 2003, he founded and directed Sopinspace, a solution provider for participatory democracy and public debate using the Internet.

Theory about sharing and open access

Works
 Sharing, Culture and the Economy in the Internet Age, 2012, Amsterdam University Press
 Internet & création: comment reconnaître les échanges hors-marché sur internet en finançant et rémunérant la création ? (2008)
 Cause commune: l'information entre bien commun et propriété (2005)

References

External links
Entry at the P2PFoundation page
Philippe Aigrain: Striking a Blow for Digital Freedom

1949 births
2021 deaths
French computer scientists
Paris Diderot University alumni